Huangmaozhou Town is an urban town in Yuanjiang, Yiyang, Hunan Province, People's Republic of China.

References

External links

Divisions of Yuanjiang